Gele may refer to:


Geography
 River Gele, a river in Wales
 Mont Gelé (Bagnes), a mountain on the border between Bagnes, Valais, in Switzerland and Valle d'Aosta in Italy
 Mont Gelé (Riddes), a mountain in Valais, Switzerland
 Gele Mountain, Geleshan National Forest Park, near Chongqing, China

People
 Sophie Harmansdochter (1505–1562), also known as Gele Fye, Dutch informant targeting religious minorities
 Gela Seksztajn (1907–1943), also known as Gele Seckstein, Polish-Jewish artist and painter

Other uses
 Gele (electoral ward), Conwy County Borough, Wales
 Fongoro language or Gele, a nearly extinct language spoken in Chad
 Kele language (New Guinea) or Gele’ 
 a head tie, in the Yoruba language
 Prosopis africana, a tree species called gele in the Malinka language

See also 
 Alphonse van Gèle (1848–1939), Belgian soldier and Vice-Governor General of the Congo Free State